is a monthly Japanese seinen manga magazine, published on the 19th each month by Akita Shoten since August 19, 2002 (cover date October 2002), initially published as a shōnen magazine.

 was a special manga edition of Champion Red that ceased publication in 2014.

Current serializations
Captain Harlock: Dimensional Voyage
Dead Tube
Kenrantaru Grande Scène
Jinrouki Winvurga
Otome no Chigiri
Scarface
Shinju no Nectar
Galaxy Express 999 Another Story: Ultimate Journey
Franken Fran Frantic (February 2019)
Cyborg 009 BOOGPARTS DELETE
Saint Seiya: Meiō Iden - Dark Wing
Misumi-san wa Misukasenai
Isekai no Hime to no Koi Bakuchi ni, Jinrui no Sonbō ga Kakkatemasu
Saint Seiya: Rerise of Poseidon 
Kojirase Tensei Maō to 7-nin no Oshikake Otome no Ragnarok System

Past serializations

Champion Red
Alien Nine Emulators by Hitoshi Tomizawa (2002)
Batman & the Justice League (June 19, 2017 - May 17, 2019)
Blassreiter: Genetic ( - )
Cat Paradise ( - )
Change 123 ( - )
Devilman Grimoire ( - )
Densha Otoko: The Story of a Train Man Who Fell in Love With A Girl ( - )
Fuan no Tane by Masaaki Nakayama ( - )
Franken Fran ( - )
Gomaden Shutendoji ( - )
Linebarrels of Iron ( - )
Princess Tutu ( - )
Saint Seiya Episode.G ( - )
Saint Seiya: Saintia Shō ( - )
The Qwaser of Stigmata ( - )
Ray ( - )
Shounen Princess: Putri Harimau Naoko ( – )
Shin Mazinger Zero ( - )
Witchblade Takeru ( - )
Yakuza Girl ( - )
Yomeiro Choice ( - , pulled from Champion Red Ichigo)

Champion Red Ichigo
Aki Sora ( - )
The Everyday Tales of a Cat God ( - )
The Fruit of Grisaia: Sanctuary Fellows (moved to Champion Cross)
Junk: Record of the Last Hero ( - , pulled from Champion Red)
Kagaku Na Yatsura (2010 - 2013)
Koi Koi Seven ( - , pulled from Champion Red)
Rescue Me! ( - )
Saint Seiya Episode.G: Assassin (moved to Champion Cross)
Shigurui ( - , pulled from Champion Red)

References

External links
 
ComiPedia Page

2002 establishments in Japan
Akita Shoten magazines
Magazines established in 2002
Magazines established in 2006
Magazines published in Tokyo
Monthly manga magazines published in Japan
Seinen manga magazines
Shōnen manga magazines